Chalo Ishq Larain is a Pakistani film directed by Hassan Askari, which was released across Pakistan in April 2002, starring Meera, Ali Haider and Zara Sheikh.

Cast 
Zara Sheikh
Meera
Ali Haider

Awards

References

External links
 

2000s Urdu-language films
Pakistani romantic musical films
2002 films
Films shot in the United Arab Emirates
Urdu-language Pakistani films